This article is a list of diseases of anemones (Anemone coronaria).

Bacterial diseases

Fungal diseases

Virus and viroid diseases

References
Common Names of Diseases, The American Phytopathological Society
Brunt A.A. (2005), Virus and Virus-like Diseases of Bulb and Flower Crops, John Wiley & Sons, New York 10158-0012, USA. Pp. 105–110. Loebenstein, G; Lawson, R.H and Brunt A.A. (eds).
Anemone